The Railway Children is a 1970 British family drama film based on the 1906 novel of the same name by E. Nesbit. The film was directed by Lionel Jeffries and stars Dinah Sheridan, Jenny Agutter (who had earlier featured in the BBC's 1968 dramatisation of the novel), Sally Thomsett and Bernard Cribbins in leading roles. The film was released to cinemas in the United Kingdom on 21 December 1970.

The film rights were bought by Jeffries. It was his directorial debut and he wrote the screenplay. The Railway Children was a critical success, both at time of release and in later years.

Plot
The storyline is episodic, reflecting the original serialisation of the novel. In 1905, the Waterburys are an affluent family who live in a luxurious villa in the suburbs of London. Charles Waterbury, the father, works at the Foreign Office. The day after Christmas, he is arrested on suspicion of being a spy. This is hidden from the rest of the family by his wife. The family become impoverished and are forced to move to a house called Three Chimneys in Yorkshire, which is near Oakworth railway station. When they arrive, they find the house in a mess and rat-infested. The three children, Roberta (known by her nickname Bobbie), Phyllis and Peter, find amusement in watching the trains on the nearby railway line and waving to the passengers. They become friends with Albert Perks, the station porter, and with an elderly gentleman who regularly takes the 9:15 train. To make ends meet, their mother works as a writer and also home-schools the children.

Mrs Waterbury falls ill with influenza. Bobbie writes to the gentleman, who delivers food and medicine to the house to help their mother get better. They are admonished by their mother for telling others of their plight and asking for assistance. The following day, a man is found at the railway station. He speaks a language they cannot understand. The children figure out he can speak French, in which their mother is fluent. Mrs Waterbury discovers the man is an exiled Russian writer who has arrived in England to find his family who had fled there. He stays at their house. Bobbie writes another letter to the gentleman, asking him to help in finding the exile's family, who are soon found.

One day, while watching the railway tracks, they notice there has been a landslide which has partially obstructed the tracks. The children fashion the girls' red petticoats into flags to warn the driver of the impending danger. The train stops due to their warning. The railway company and villagers hold a party for the children and thank them for their actions. The children are given personalised engraved watches and are dubbed "The Railway Children".

The children find out that Mr Perks, the station porter, doesn't celebrate his birthday. They secretly ask for gifts from the villagers that he has helped in the past and deliver the gifts to his house. Mr Perks initially refuses the gifts as he doesn't accept charity. However, after the children explain that the gifts are from people that he has helped over the years, he thanks them for their kindness. In return the following day, he delivers old newspapers and magazines for them to read. Bobbie reads one of the newspapers and notices a story about their father being imprisoned. She discusses this with her mother who finally discloses that their father is in prison after having been falsely convicted of being a spy and selling state secrets. She speculates that a jealous colleague of his may be behind it. Bobbie again contacts the gentleman and asks him to help her father; he informs her that since meeting the children and reading about their father's case, he has been working to prove his innocence.

A group of youths are playing a game of paper chase which the children observe. One of the boys injures his leg in a railway tunnel and is helped by the children. He is taken to their house where he recuperates from his injuries. The gentleman visits their house and reveals that the boy is his grandson, Jim, and thanks the family for looking after him. Jim and Bobbie grow close during his recuperation and promise to write to each other when he departs to his home.

After Jim's departure, the children remark on their long hiatus from waving at the train passengers, and resolve to go to the railway the following morning. When they do so, all the passengers wave at them, and the gentleman gestures to a newspaper. Later, with a strange prescience, Bobbie excuses herself from her lessons and walks down to the station, where Perks hints that something special has happened. Confused, Bobbie stands on the station platform, where in the silent lingering smoke she sees her father, who has just alighted onto the platform after being exonerated and released from prison. She runs to greet him shouting "daddy; my daddy!". They return to 'Three Chimneys' and the family are reunited.

End credits
The entire cast break the fourth wall and perform a curtain call as the credits roll. The camera moves slowly along a railway track towards a steam engine which is decked in flags, in front of which all of the cast are assembled, waving and cheering to the camera. At the start of the credit sequence, a voice can be heard shouting "Thank you, Mr Forbes" to acknowledge producer Bryan Forbes. At the end, Bobbie Waterbury (Jenny Agutter) holds up a small slate on which "The End" is written in chalk.

Cast

 Jenny Agutter as Roberta 'Bobbie' Waterbury
 Sally Thomsett as Phyllis Waterbury
 Gary Warren as Peter Waterbury 
 Dinah Sheridan as Mother, Mrs. Waterbury 
 Bernard Cribbins as Albert Perks
 William Mervyn as the Old Gentleman
 Iain Cuthbertson as Father, Charles Waterbury
 Peter Bromilow as Doctor Forrest 
 Ann Lancaster as Ruth 
 Gordon Whiting as Russian
 Beatrix Mackey as Aunt Emma 
 Deddie Davies as Mrs. Nell Perks 
 David Lodge as Band Leader
 Christopher Witty as Jim
 Brenda Cowling as Mrs. Hilda Viney 
 Paddy Ward as Cart Man 
 Erik Chitty as Photographer 
 Sally James as Maid 
 Dominic Allan as CID Man  
 Andy Wainwright as Desk Sergeant 
 Lionel Jeffries as Malcolm (Voice)
 Richard Leech as Doctor (Voice)
 Amelia Bayntun as Cook (uncredited)
 Bob Cryer (Chairman of the K&WVR) as the guard of the train carrying Mr. Waterbury (uncredited)
 Paul Luty as Malcolm (uncredited)
 Graham Mitchell (K&WVR Guard) as Train Guard (uncredited)

Production

Earlier adaptations
The novel was adapted for radio in 1943.

It was serialised for television in 1951, as a part of Children's Hour, starring Jean Anderson. The 1951 script was reworked and adapted for television again in 1957, with location scenes filmed on the now-closed Cranleigh line. Jean Anderson reprised her role as Mother.

In 1968, a seven-part television series was made with a fully-revised script. The series starred Jenny Agutter, and the fledgling Keighley & Worth Valley Railway, with its station at Oakworth, was used for location scenes.

Development
Lionel Jeffries read the book for the first time when he was returning to Britain by ship from the US to film Chitty Chitty Bang Bang, in which he appeared as an actor. He had lost his own books and borrowed The Railway Children from his 13-year-old daughter Martha (he had two other children). He loved it, although he admitted "my personality is so different from the quiet romance of the story."

However, he said "I found the climate of the... story just right for me, a way in which to start entertaining people and help not destroy our industry. There are hardly any films being made for children and for middle aged and older age groups. I thought this could be one."

He bought a six-month option on the film rights for £300 and wrote a screenplay. "I've kept to the story," said Jeffries. "It would be an imposition not to – after all, E. Nesbit's survived 50 years."

Jeffries succeeded in attracting financing from Bryan Forbes at EMI Films, who was interested in making family films. Forbes suggested Jeffries direct. "I knew there were slight bets among the technical staff as to how long I'd last," said Jeffries later.

The film was part of Forbes's initial (and, it turned out, only) slate for films at EMI.

Jeffries later said "I knew we were taking a big, calculated risk in swimming against the permissive mainstream with such a story. All I could do was make it as honestly as possible: a Victorian documentary."

Casting
Sally Thomsett was cast as the 11-year-old Phyllis, despite being 20 years old at the time. Her contract forbade her to reveal her true age during the making of the film and she was also not allowed to be seen smoking or drinking during the shoot. 17-year-old Jenny Agutter played her older sister, Roberta, and Gary Warren played their brother, Peter. Agutter had previously played the same role in the 1968 BBC Television adaptation of the story. Dinah Sheridan was cast as Mother and Bernard Cribbins as Perks the porter.

Jeffries admitted he was tempted to play the role of Perks himself, but eventually decided to cast Cribbins "because of his lovely calm comedy."

Filming locations
Inspired by the BBC's 1968 adaptation, Lionel Jeffries used the Keighley and Worth Valley Railway as the backdrop for the film, referring to it as per the original story as the "Great Northern and Southern Railway".

At the time of filming, there were still very few heritage railways in Britain and only the KWVR could provide a tunnel, which is important in a number of scenes. The tunnel is a lot shorter in reality than it appears in the film, for which a temporary extension to the tunnel was made using canvas covers.

Four of the already-preserved locomotives based on the Worth Valley Railway were chosen for use in the film's production in relation to role; MSC67 as the local train engine, newly-arrived 5775 (L89) as the Old Gentleman's engine, 52044 (preserved as L&Y 957) as 'The Green Dragon' express and 4744 (69523/1744) as the 'Scotch Flyer'. They were painted in period-inspired liveries for the filming: 5775 in brown, reminiscent of the Stroudley livery of the London Brighton and South Coast Railway; 957 in apple green, similar to liveries used by the North Eastern Railway; Great Northern Railway; and London and North Eastern Railway, and 4744 and MSC67 in plain black, as used by most railway companies in Britain at one time or another. 67 is now at the Middleton Railway in Leeds and 4744 is now with the North Norfolk Railway at Sheringham. 5775 and 957 are still on the Worth Valley Railway. As of 2021, 957 has returned to service after overhaul in its film guise, and 5775 is on static display at the Oxenhope Exhibition Shed having been repainted into its GN&SR livery. 4744 is undergoing a ten-yearly overhaul in Norfolk and 67 remains at Middleton but on display, having last operated in 2012.

A wide variety of vintage rolling stock was used in the film, including examples from the Metropolitan and London and North Eastern railways. Although different carriages appeared in different liveries, the dominant one is white and maroon, which is reminiscent of the livery of the Caledonian Railway. The most important carriage in the film, the Old Gentleman's Saloon, was a North Eastern Railway Director's Saloon; it has also been used for the more recent stage production adaptation of the book. It and all the other carriages seen in the film are still at the KWVR, but tend to be used at special events only due to their age.

A number of different locations were employed for various scenes. The house called "Three Chimneys" is in Oxenhope, just north of the Oxenhope railway station. The Bronte Parsonage in Haworth was used as the location for Doctor Forrest's surgery. The scenes of the children sitting on a bridge were filmed at Wycoller, near Colne. Mytholmes Tunnel, near Haworth, and the railway line running through it, were used extensively in the film, including being the location for the paper chase scene, as well as the famous landslide scene, in which the children wave the girls' petticoats in the air to warn the train about said blockage. The landslide sequence itself was filmed in a cutting on the Oakworth side of Mytholmes Tunnel and the fields of long grass, where the children waved to the trains, are situated on the Haworth side of the tunnel. A leaflet, "The Railway Children Walks", is available from KWVR railway stations or the Haworth Tourist Information Centre.

The scenes in the Waterburys' London house, before their move to Yorkshire, were filmed at 4 Gainsborough Gardens in Hampstead, north-west London.

Release

Box office
The film was the ninth most popular film at the British box office in 1971 and recouped its cost in that country alone. It was one of the few financial successes of Bryan Forbes's regime at EMI Films. By June 1972 it had earned EMI a profit of £52,000.

Critical reception
Since its release, the film has received universally positive reviews and holds a 100% rating on Rotten Tomatoes, based on fifteen reviews.

Home media
A 40th anniversary Blu-ray and DVD was released on 5 May 2010 with a new digitally remastered print. It includes new interviews with Sally Thomsett, Jenny Agutter and Bernard Cribbins. The planned commentary by director Lionel Jeffries was not completed due to his death in February 2010.

Awards and nominations
The Railway Children received three nominations for awards at the 24th British Academy Film Awards ceremony. Bernard Cribbins was nominated in the category of Best Supporting Actor. However, in a category also featuring  John Mills, Colin Welland and Gig Young, the award went to Welland for his role in the film Kes. Sally Thomsett received a nomination for Best Newcomer in a Leading Role but again lost out to an actor from Kes, in this case David Bradley. Johnny Douglas was also nominated for the Anthony Asquith Award for Film Music but the award was won by American Burt Bacharach for his film score for Butch Cassidy and the Sundance Kid.

Merchandise
Hornby Railways produced a 00 gauge train set of the train from the film. It had a London, Midland and Scottish Railway 0–6–0 tank shunting locomotive in GN&SR livery with Synchrosmoke, two period coaches, an oval of track and a station.

Bachmann Branchline currently produces a 00 gauge train pack from the film, albeit a more accurate set. It includes a GWR 5700 Class locomotive in GN&SR's brown livery, two LMS Period I carriages in GN&SR's maroon and white livery, and a model of the Oakworth station building.

In 2010, to coincide with the 40th anniversary, a book was brought out called The Making of the Railway Children by Jim Shipley – a former volunteer station master of Oakworth Station. It detailed events that took place during filming and interviews from local people associated with it. In November 2012, a second updated version was printed with added information, in particular about Gary Warren, who disappeared in the mid-1970s after retiring from acting. He had been tracked down by a member of the official Catweazle fanclub and the author had permission to write a more updated version of what had happened to him.

BBFC complaint
In 2013, the British Board of Film Classification released a statement saying that they had received and evaluated a complaint about the film in that it encouraged children to trespass on the railway tracks. The BBFC noted that the children did trespass on the line, but only to warn an approaching train of the danger of a landslide on the track ahead. They had, however, in an earlier scene walked along the track simply to get to the station. The BBFC also pointed out that the film was set in Edwardian times when access to railway lines was not under the same restrictions as modern times.

Legacy
The film has left a lasting impression on the British film industry and audiences. In 1999, the British Film Institute (BFI) put The Railway Children in 66th place in its list of the Top 100 British films of all time. Five years later, the film magazine Total Film named it the 46th greatest British film of the 20th century. In 2005, the British Film Institute included it in their list of 'The 50 films you should see by the age of 14'. In 2008, the film made it onto Channel 4's list of the 100 Greatest Family Films at number 30, just ahead of Monsters, Inc. and just behind Men in Black and Ghostbusters.

On 28 March 2010, the Bradford International Film Festival concluded with a new restoration of The Railway Children film with the 40th anniversary digital premiere.

Jenny Agutter also starred in a new TV adaptation of The Railway Children in 2000 in the role of Mother.  Much of the publicity for the 2000 film focused on Agutter's involvement in both films which were made a generation apart.

In 2021 BBC Radio 4 broadcast The Saving of Albert Perks, a monologue by Bernard Cribbins in which the now adult Roberta returns to Oakworth with two Jewish refugee children who have escaped Nazi Germany on the Kindertransport.

Sequel
In May 2021, a sequel titled The Railway Children Return starring Jenny Agutter, started filming in and around Oakworth. It was released on July 15, 2022.

See also
BFI Top 100 British films
Edith Nesbit
The Railway Children (book)
The Railway Children (2000 film)

Not to be confused with The Boxcar Children, an American book and film series of a similar name.

 The Boxcar Children
 The Boxcar Children (2014 film)

References

External links
 
 
 
 Locomotive MSC67
1951 TV adaptatio at IMDb
1957 TV adaptation at IMDb
1968 TV adaptation at IMDb

1970 films
1970s historical drama films
British children's drama films
British historical drama films
1970s children's drama films
Films shot at EMI-Elstree Studios
Films based on children's books
Films directed by Lionel Jeffries
Films set in the 1900s
Films set in London
Films set in Yorkshire
Films shot in Yorkshire
Keighley and Worth Valley Railway
Rail transport films
Universal Pictures films
Films scored by Johnny Douglas
EMI Films films
1970 directorial debut films
1970 drama films
1970s English-language films
1970s British films